Yamachiche is a municipality in the Mauricie region of the province of Quebec in Canada.

Etymology
The name Yamachiche was first used to identify the Little Yamachiche River (Petite rivière Yamachiche) which runs through the town. It came from the First Nations (possibly Cree) words iyamitaw (meaning "much") and achichki (meaning "mud"). Therefore Yamachiche could have the general meaning of "muddy river", which is a characteristic of this stream. In Abenaki, it was identified as Namasis (small fish) and Obamasis (small white fish).

The name has gone through many spelling variations: Machiche, Ouabmachiche, Yabamachiche, Hyamachiche, Yamachiste, Amachis, à Machis, à Mashis, Machis, Augmachiche, Ouamachiche, Yabmachiche, etc., which have mainly affected the name of the river, whereas the parish and municipal names have remained more stable.

History

In 1653, the area was part of a fief granted to Pierre Boucher de Grosbois, Governor of Trois-Rivières, and in 1672, it was formally ceded to Grosbois. The Grosbois or Machiche Seignory was 1.5 leagues long by 2 leagues deep along the shores of Lac Saint-Pierre. But because of war with the Iroquois First Nation, it could not be colonized until the beginning of the 18th century.

In 1703, the first colonists, the three Gélinas brothers, settled in the area and by 1706, there were 7 families. The same year, the name Yamachiche first appeared in the census. In 1711, the first chapel was built, dedicated to Sainte Anne by Récollet Siméon Dupont, and the Parish of Sainte-Anne was formed in 1722. A year later, the settlement consisted of about 20 families and 100 persons.

In 1725, the Chemin du Roy (French for "King's Highway") was built connecting it with Louiseville and Pointe-du-Lac. In 1764, the West Grosbois Seignory was purchased by Conrad Gugy, thereby becoming the first French-Canadian Seignory in English possession. Between 1765 and 1790, Yamachiche grew quickly with new settlers from Acadia (Acadians expelled by the English) and from the United States, particularly Loyalists from Massachusetts.

In 1828, the Saint-Barnabé and Saint-Sévère Parishes were formed by separating from the Sainte-Anne-d'Yamachiche Parish. In 1831, the post office opened. In 1845, the Municipality of Yamachiche was founded but abolished in 1847. It was reestablished in 1855 as the Parish Municipality of Sainte-Anne-d'Yamachiche, with Francois Gerin-Lajoie as first mayor. In 1878, the first train came to Yamachiche, followed by the telegraph in 1880.

In 1887, the village separated from the parish municipality and became the Village Municipality of Yamachiche, with George Felix Heroux as first mayor. In 1895, telephone was installed in Yamachiche and street lighting in 1904.

In 1973, the railway station (Canadian Pacific) closed, but in 1975, the new Quebec Autoroute 40 opened, providing access to Yamachiche with 3 interchanges. In 1987, the village and parish municipalities were merged to form the current Municipality of Yamachiche.

List of mayors

Yamachiche's first local government was established in 1855.  From 1887 to 1987, Yamachiche was divided into a parish municipality and a village municipality.  Each entity had its own local council and its own mayor.  Both structures were merged in 1988 with only one municipal council and one mayor.  Officially, municipal elections in Yamachiche are on a non-partisan basis.

Parish Municipality of Sainte-Anne-d'Yamachiche

Village Municipality of Yamachiche

Merged municipality

Demographics
Population trend:
 Population in 2011: 2787 (2006 to 2011 population change: 1.0%)
 Population in 2006: 2760
 Population in 2001: 2631
 Population in 1996: 2776
 Population in 1991: 2784

Private dwellings occupied by usual residents: 1160 (total dwellings: 1226)

Mother tongue:
 English as first language: 0%
 French as first language: 99.1%
 English and French as first language: 0.5%
 Other as first language: 0.4%

Notable people from Yamachiche
 Louis-Onésime Loranger (1837-1917), a Canadian politician
 Nérée Beauchemin (1850–1931), poet and physician
 Antoine Gérin-Lajoie (1824–1882), poet and novelist

Footnotes

Incorporated places in Mauricie
Municipalities in Quebec